Jessie Nelson is an American film producer, director, and writer.

Career
Nelson began her career acting with the theater group Mabou Mines at the Public Theater in New York and she went on to perform in Shakespeare In The Park.

Nelson began her directing career with the award-winning short film To the Moon, Alice (1990), which she also wrote. The film starred Chris Cooper and was part of a television program for Showtime titled The Showtime 30-Minute Movie.

Her first feature film was Corrina, Corrina (1994) which she wrote, directed, and produced. It starred Whoopi Goldberg and Ray Liotta. The film was suggested by her life. She went on to write, direct, and produce I Am Sam (2001) starring Sean Penn.

She received the first Stanley Kramer Award from the Producers Guild for I Am Sam in 2002.

Her most recent film is Love the Coopers (2015), starring a large ensemble cast, including Diane Keaton, John Goodman, and Alan Arkin.

She co-wrote Stepmom (1998) and The Story of Us (1999), and co-wrote and produced Because I Said So and produced Fred Claus based on a bedtime story she would tell her daughter. In 2014 she produced Danny Collins which starred Al Pacino and Annette Bening.

She wrote the Broadway musical adaptation of the movie Waitress with music and lyrics by Sara Bareilles, directed by Diane Paulus, which premiered on Broadway in April 2016. She co-wrote and directed the musical Alice by Heart with Steven Sater and music by Duncan Sheik, which opened Off-Broadway in February 2019.

Nelson co-authored the 2011 children's book Labracadabra (Penguin, 2011) with Karen Leigh Hopkins.

Personal life
She is married to director Bryan Gordon. They have a daughter, actress Molly Gordon.

She is Jewish.

Filmography

Film

Television

References

External links

American film directors
American film producers
20th-century American screenwriters
University of California, Santa Cruz alumni
American women film directors
American women screenwriters
Living people
Place of birth missing (living people)
Year of birth missing (living people)
American children's writers
American women children's writers
American women film producers
20th-century American women writers
21st-century American screenwriters
21st-century American women writers
American musical theatre librettists
Women librettists